Heman Smith may refer to:

Heman C. Smith (1850–1919), leader in and official historian of the Reorganized Church of Jesus Christ of Latter Day Saints
Heman R. Smith (1795–1861), Vermont farmer and military officer